José Antonio Martínez Álvarez (born 29 July 1997), commonly known as Josín, is a Spanish footballer who plays for CD Guijuelo as a central defender.

Club career
Born in Oviedo, Asturias, Josín was a Real Oviedo youth graduate. He made his senior debut with the reserves on 10 May 2015, aged only 17, starting in a 1–0 away win against Atlético de Lugones SD in the Tercera División.

Despite being still registered with the Juvenil squad, Josín was called up to the first team for a Segunda División match against UE Llagostera on 6 May 2016. He only made his professional debut on 4 June, coming on as a second-half substitute for Josete in a 0–5 away loss against CA Osasuna; he was also sent off after one minute on the field after conceding a penalty.

Josín scored his first senior goal on 17 September 2016, netting the game's only in a home success over CD Tineo.

References

External links

1997 births
Living people
Footballers from Oviedo
Spanish footballers
Association football defenders
Segunda División players
Segunda División B players
Tercera División players
Real Oviedo Vetusta players
Real Oviedo players
CD Guijuelo footballers